The 1977 USAC Championship Car season consisted of 14 races, beginning in Ontario, California on March 6 and concluding in Avondale, Arizona on October 29.  The USAC National Champion was Tom Sneva and the Indianapolis 500 winner was A. J. Foyt.  The schedule included a road course for the first time since 1970.

Schedule and results

 The Machinist Union 150, scheduled for September 24, was first postponed due to rain, and was eventually cancelled on October 3.

Final points standings

See also
 1977 Indianapolis 500

References

 
 
 
 
 http://media.indycar.com/pdf/2011/IICS_2011_Historical_Record_Book_INT6.pdf  (p. 217-218)

USAC Championship Car season
USAC Championship Car
1977 in American motorsport